Entoloma medianox is a species of agaric (gilled mushroom) in the family Entolomataceae. It is known from western North America, where it was previously referred to the European species Entoloma bloxamii or E. madidum. Molecular research, based on cladistic analysis of DNA sequences, has, however, shown that Entoloma medianox is distinct.

Description
The fungus produces a striking, blue, mushroom-shaped fruiting body (basidiocarp), between August and November. The smooth cap measures  and has a broad swelling in the centre (known as a boss or umbo). The tightly packed, white gills on the underside of the cap contrast well with the blue colour of the fungus; they become more salmon-pink as they age. The spore print is pink to cinnamon-coloured.

See also
List of Entoloma species

References

Fungi of North America
Fungi described in 2015
Entolomataceae